Charfeddine is a surname. Notable people with the surname include:
 Amira Charfeddine, Tunisian novelist
 Ridha Charfeddine (born 1952), Tunisian politician and sports manager
Taoufik Charfeddine, Tunisian politician, Minister of the Interior in 2020-2021

Surnames of African origin